EuroBrun Racing was an Italian-licensed Formula One constructor based in Senago, Milan, Italy. They participated in 46 Grands Prix between 1988 and 1990, entering a total of 76 cars.

Background
The team was a combination of two outfits – the mechanical manpower and skill of Giampaolo Pavanello's Euroracing team, who had also run the factory-backed Alfa Romeo Formula One team from 1982–85, and the financial muscle and organisational skill of Swiss slot machine magnate Walter Brun, who owned and ran the Brun Motorsport sports car team.

1988

Despite a solid if unspectacular start to the season, EuroBrun were soon struggling as money ran low. There was internal trouble when Brun unsuccessfully tried to replace Larrauri with Christian Danner (the Argentine driver had gained the unwanted reputation among his fellow drivers of being a 'mobile chicane' in both qualifying and races) and Euroracing were showing disinterest in Formula One. Both drivers failed to qualify at certain events (Modena missing out four times and being excluded from another two races for technical infringements, and Larrauri failing seven times). Modena's 11th place at the Hungarian Grand Prix was the team's best result of the year.

1989
Before the  season, Euroracing slimmed down to a nominal level of involvement, in the shape of a handful of engineers and mechanics. EuroBrun scaled back to a single car (being the only team to enter one car that year, as opposed to two) to be driven by Swiss driver Gregor Foitek, while the ER188 was modified slightly to take a Judd V8 engine and Pirelli tyres. The team would only make it through pre-qualifying once, in the opening race of the season in Brazil, and then Foitek failed to qualify. Even the introduction of George Ryton's new ER189 for the German Grand Prix did not help. Foitek quit after the Belgian Grand Prix, to be replaced by the returning Larrauri, who was no more successful.

1990
Euroracing had now left the partnership altogether and the team started the season with the ER189. Roberto Moreno led the team, with Claudio Langes in the second car. Langes would not make it through pre-qualifying once. A freak qualifying session at the opening race of the season in the United States saw Moreno start 16th on the grid and he eventually finished 13th. The capable Brazilian qualified again in San Marino and came close on other occasions, but as Brun lost enthusiasm, the EuroBruns fell further and further away from the grid. After 14 rounds the team withdrew from the Formula One Championship, having made only 21 starts from 76 entries. In 2021, Moreno claimed that the team purposely did not want to qualify for races so as not to spend funds they did not have on extra tyres and engine rebuilds, stating that the team gave him race-marked tyres to qualify on and the Judd engines went as long as four events without rebuilds.

Complete Formula One results
(key)

References

External links
 Team Profile at Grand Prix Encyclopedia
 Team profile at F1 rejects
 Results from Formula1.com

Formula One constructors
Formula One entrants
Italian auto racing teams
Italian racecar constructors
Auto racing teams established in 1988
Auto racing teams disestablished in 1990